Lautaro Ariel Díaz (born 21 May 1998) is an Argentine footballer who plays as either a winger or a forward for Ecuadorian club Independiente del Valle, on loan from Estudiantes de Buenos Aires.

Club career

Estudiantes de Buenos Aires
Born in Buenos Aires, Díaz was a youth exponent of hometown side Estudiantes de Buenos Aires, making his first team debut on 8 May 2019 in a 2–1 Primera B Metropolitana home loss against All Boys. He featured in another two matches during the season as his side achieved promotion to Primera Nacional, and scored his first goal on 10 January 2021, netting the winner in a 2–1 away success over Ferro Carril Oeste.

Loan to Villa Dálmine
On 21 July 2021, Díaz moved to fellow second division team Villa Dálmine on loan until December 2022. After only one goal in the 2021 season, he scored six times during the first half of the 2022 campaign before leaving in June 2022.

Loan to Independiente del Valle
On 14 June 2022, Díaz moved abroad and agreed to a one-year loan deal with Ecuadorian Serie A side Independiente del Valle. He impressed with the club in the 2022 Copa Sudamericana, scoring five goals (one of them in the Final against São Paulo, where he was named man-of-the-match) and helping the side to lift their second trophy in the competition.

Personal life
Díaz's father Roberto was also a footballer and a forward. He was a part of the Argentina squad in the 1979 Copa América. After his proeminence at Independiente del Valle, he was often compared to Jack Grealish due to his looks.

Career statistics

Honours
Independiente del Valle
Copa Sudamericana: 2022

References

External links
 
 

1998 births
Living people
Footballers from Buenos Aires
Argentine footballers
Association football forwards
Estudiantes de Buenos Aires footballers
Villa Dálmine footballers
C.S.D. Independiente del Valle footballers
Argentine Primera División players
Primera Nacional players
Primera B Metropolitana players
Ecuadorian Serie A players
Argentine expatriate footballers
Argentine expatriate sportspeople in Ecuador
Expatriate footballers in Ecuador